Chrostosoma is a genus of moths in the subfamily Arctiinae. The genus was erected by Jacob Hübner in 1819.

Species
 Chrostosoma cardinale Schaus, 1898
 Chrostosoma chryseridia Draudt, 1915
 Chrostosoma decisa (Walker, [1865])
 Chrostosoma destricta Draudt, 1915
 Chrostosoma dhamis Schaus, 1920
 Chrostosoma echemus Stoll, 1782
 Chrostosoma endochrysa (Dognin, 1911)
 Chrostosoma enna Schaus, 1924
 Chrostosoma fassli Draudt, 1915
 Chrostosoma guianensis Kaye, 191?
 Chrostosoma haematica Perty, 1834
 Chrostosoma halli Kaye, 191?
 Chrostosoma infuscatum Rothschild, 1931
 Chrostosoma lea Schaus, 1924
 Chrostosoma mediana Schaus, 1928
 Chrostosoma mysia Druce, 1906
 Chrostosoma patricia Schaus, 1912
 Chrostosoma pellucida Schaus, 1905
 Chrostosoma plagiata Rothschild, 1911
 Chrostosoma rica Dognin, 1897
 Chrostosoma schausi Rothschild, 1911
 Chrostosoma semirubra Hampson, 1898
 Chrostosoma tabascensis Dyar, 1916
 Chrostosoma tricolor Felder, 1868
 Chrostosoma trimaculatum Strand, 1912
 Chrostosoma unxa Druce, 1896
 Chrostosoma viridipunctata Rothschild, 1911

References

External links

"Genus: Chrostosoma Hübner, 1821". Cahurel-entomologie. Images.

 
Euchromiina
Moth genera